is a Japanese manga series written by Kazuo Koike and illustrated by Kazuo Kamimura. It was serialized in Shueisha's Weekly Playboy magazine from February 1972 to March 1973. The series revolves around the title character, a female assassin who seeks vengeance against the bandits who raped her mother and murdered both her father and older brother.

Lady Snowblood was translated into English and published in four volumes by Dark Horse Comics between 2005 and 2006. The manga was adapted into a live-action film of the same name starring Meiko Kaji in 1973, which was followed by Lady Snowblood: Love Song of Vengeance in 1974. The manga and film adaptations have influenced a number of other works.

Title 
Additionally, shura nods to the Buddhist path of the asura, in which a devout follower is prepared to kill. The title was translated as Lady Snowblood because Asura is associated with the term shuraba "scene of a great battle" or "scene of carnage".

Plot 
A band of four villainous criminals murder the husband and child of a woman whom they rape. The woman kills one of the bandits and is imprisoned without parole; she decides to seduce a guard to become pregnant, and has her daughter raised by a friend in order to avenge the family. The girl, Oyuki / Lady Snowblood, grows up and determines to set up crime boss Okono Kitahama so she will be convicted as a murderer. Kitahama's cohort Gishiro Tsukamoto discovers Oyuki's plan and uses her ally Miyanara as bait, but Oyuki defeats him. Another cohort, Hanzo Takemura, begs for Oyuki's forgiveness, but she slays him in a final act of vengeance.

Characters 

Lady Snowblood
Oyuki is a seductive and beautiful woman, with formidable skills in using a blade hidden in her umbrella. She has been entrusted with a task of vengeance by her mother to kill the three surviving criminals who murdered her brother and father. When necessary, she uses her sex appeal to distract her foes.

Miyanara-san
A writer who pens Oyuki's story in an effort to draw the final two tormentors out in the open. Although antagonistic at first, he comes to treat Oyuki as his daughter, even risking his life to assist in her quest. It is implied through their final interaction that Oyuki will return to take care of him, as he is the closest thing to a father that she has ever had.

Matsuemon-san
The leader of a band of beggars who assists Oyuki in discovering the location of her kill list in return for Oyuki stealing a hojicho for him.

Production 
Written by Kazuo Koike and illustrated by Kazuo Kamimura, Lady Snowblood was serialized in Shueisha's Weekly Playboy magazine between February 29, 1972 and March 6, 1973. The chapters were collected and published under the Playboy Zōkan imprint in two volumes on December 10, 1972 and March 15, 1973. Since then the manga has been republished in various editions by different publishers, including a 1976–1977 three volume edition by Akita Shoten, a five volume 1985 edition by Takeshobo, and a two volume 2001 edition by Kadokawa Shoten.

 was serialized in Weekly Playboy from November 1973 to June 1974.

Lady Snowblood was translated and published in English between 2005–2006 by Dark Horse Comics as a series of four volumes, collected into more-or-less self-contained chapters.

Media

English volumes

Film adaptations 

In 1973, the manga was adapted into a feature film of the same name by director Toshiya Fujita, starring Meiko Kaji. The film was followed by Lady Snowblood: Love Song of Vengeance in 1974. A science fiction remake titled The Princess Blade, starring Yumiko Shaku, was released in 2001.

Lady Snowblood and its 1973 adaptation are credited as major sources of inspiration behind Quentin Tarantino's Kill Bill.

Additionally, the manga and film adaptation are an inspiration for the 2021 anime series Joran: The Princess of Snow and Blood.

Stage adaptations 
In November 2021, the stage adaptation of the manga was performed at the CBGK Shibugeki theater in Tokyo, with Yui Imaizumi as the main character. A sequel titled  was performed in February 2022.

Reception 
Tom Rosin from Manga Life considers Lady Snowblood "another cold-blooded revenge drama from the author of Lone Wolf", and says he enjoyed the mix of Western modernization and Japanese traditionalism. W .E. Wallo from Blogcritics.org finds the English translation weak compared to that of Lone Wolf and Cub, but recommends it to any fans of the latter series. Similarly to Tom Rosin, he praises the prevalent East–West dichotomy.

References

External links 

 

1972 manga
Dark Horse Comics titles
Kazuo Koike
Manga adapted into films
Samurai in anime and manga
Seinen manga
Shueisha manga
Anime and manga about revenge
Orphan characters in anime and manga
Fictional murderers
Fictional swordfighters in anime and manga
Fictional female assassins
Fictional serial killers
Fictional female murderers

fr:Lady Snowblood